Events in the year 1707 in India.

Incumbents
Aurangzeb, Mughal Emperor, 31 July 1658- 3 March 1707.
Bahadur Shah I, Mughal Emperor, 19 June 1707 – 27 February 1712
Muhammad Azam Shah, self-proclaimed Mughal Emperor, 14 March 1707 – 8 June 1707
Sukhrungphaa, King of the Ahom kingdom, 1696–1714
Dost Mohammad of Bhopal, Nawab of Bhopal State, 1707-1728
Bhagatsimhji Udaisimhji, Thakur Sahib of Wadhwan State, 1681–1707
Arjansimhji Madhavsimhji, Thakur Sahib of Wadhwan State, 1707–1739
Ram Singh I, Maharao of Kota State, April 1696-18 June 1707
Kanthirava Narasaraja II, Wodeyar of Mysore, 1704-1714
Rama Varma V, Maharajah of Cochin, 1701-1721
Amar Singh II, Rajput Mewar (Sisodia), 1698–1710
Chakdor Namgyal, Chogyal of Sikkim, 1700-1717
Rajaram Chhatrapati, Chhatrapati of the Maratha Empire, 1688-1707
Tarabai, Regent of the Maratha Empire, 1700–1707

Events
 National income - 8,228 million
Mughal–Maratha Wars ended in May following Mughal Emperor Aurangzeb's death
Brothers Bahadur Shah I and Muhammad Azam Shah fought the Battle of Jajau on 20 June to determine Mughal succession, leaving Bahadur Shah I in power after 32,000 died
The Delhi Army under Nawab Daud Khan captured Vellore Fort after defeating the Marathas
Dost Mohammad of Bhopal founded Bhopal State
Bundi State conquered Kota State on 18 June and held the territory for six years
Sukhrungphaa established Rangpur, the capital of the Ahom kingdom
Senapati, the grandson of Maharaja Chhatrasal, built Raja Ka Tal reservoir
Construction of the Darbar building in Dehradun was completed

Births
Chimnaji Appa, Maratha military commander who liberated the western coast of India from Portuguese rule
Suraj Mal, ruler of Bharatpur State in Rajasthan, born in February
Bhim Singh Rana, ruler of princely state Gohad, in northwestern Madhya Pradesh

Deaths
Aurangzeb, Mughal Emperor, on 3 March 1707 in Ahmednagar, Mughal Empire
Muhammad Azam Shah, self-proclaimed Mughal Emperor, on 8 June in Jajau
Bidar Bakht, Muhammad Azam Shah's son, on 8 June in Jajau
Shahzada Jawan Bakht Bahadur, Muhammad Azam Shah's son, on 8 June in Jajau
Shahzada Sikandar Shan Bahadur, Muhammad Azam Shah's son, on 8 June in Jajau
Udaipuri Mahal, at some point after 8 June in Gwalior
Zubdat-un-Nissa, Mughal princess and the third daughter of Emperor Aurangzeb and his Empress consort Dilras Banu Begum, on 17 February in Delhi
Wali Mohammed Wali, classical Urdu poet, died in Ahmedabad, Gujarat
Ram Singh I, Maharao of Kota State, 18 June 1707

References

 
India
Years of the 18th century in India